Indian Angel Network (IAN) is a group of primarily Indian angel investors funding early-stage startups. The group had 450 members from 11 countries in 2017. The members include Ajai Chowdhry, Rajan Anandan, and Anand Ladsairya. The group has invested in companies, such as PregBuddy and SuperProfs. In 2018, one of its founder Padmaja Ruparel was ranked amongst  Fortune (magazine)'s list of The Most Powerful Women in India. On Nov.8th 2020, Indian Angel Network (IAN)  announced the joint with Bangladesh Angels Network (BAN). The aim is to work together to source, cross-refer, and promote linkages in technology-enabled startups in India and Bangladesh to create an enabling environment for venture investing in both ecosystems.

References 

Organisations based in Delhi
Angel investors
Venture capital firms of India
Business services companies established in 2006